Payitaht: Abdülhamid (lit. "The Capital: Abdul Hamid"), named The Last Emperor in English, is a Turkish historical drama series starring Bülent İnal and Özlem Conker depicting historical events set during the reign of the 34th Ottoman Sultan, Abdul Hamid II. The series gained support in Turkey, and support from the descendants of Abdul Hamid II Harun and Orhan Osmanoglu has been noted as a "follow-up" to the previous television series Filinta Mustafa.

Plot

The series follows important events that marked the last 13 years of the reign of Sultan Abdül Hamid, who rules the Ottoman Empire from its capital city, known as Payitaht. His reign includes a war that resulted in the victory of the Ottoman Empire, the Greek War. It also shows the request for lands from Palestine and 1st Zionist Congress. An important project that the Sultan succeeded is the work of Hejaz railway, in addition to developing other railways, telegraph lines, and industries. Throughout his time, the Sultan faces many oppossers from all sides, from Britain and Russia to even those supposedly loyal to him. The main theme of the series is struggle and fight till the end.

Season 1

The series starts during the 20th year of the Sultan's reign. They are planning a big project, the Hejaz railway. However, the Sultan's brother-in-law, Mahmud Pasha, the British, and Theodor Herzl are trying to sabotage this project. In the harem, on the other hand, a strong rivalry between Bidar Sultan and Seniha Sultan extends to their family. Also, the Sultan's brother Murad's daughters come to the palace. His eldest daughter, Hatice Sultan, falls in love with Kemalettin Pasha and plans to marry him while on the other hand Naime Sultan, the Sultan's daughter, also is in love with Kemalettin and tries to win his heart, eventually getting ill. Hatice Sultan with her love for Naime pretends that Kemalettin loves Naime by giving a Naime a letter which Kemalettin had written to Hatice.

Mahmud Pasha, Seniha Sultan's husband, piles slander upon slander on Mehmed Pasha, Bidar Sultan's brother, eventually getting him exiled. Abdülkadir, the Sultan's son, is consistently manipulated by Mahmud Pasha and his son Sabahattin, and while trying to ruin their game gets himself into a deeper mess, getting stuck in a burning room with his mother at the end of the season which was started by Esma, a traitor servant girl, at Sabahattin's order. The Kingdom of Greece attacks Ottoman territory, and the season ends with the Ottoman Empire declaring war on Greece.

Season 2

The new century begins. Sultan Abdül Hamid changed the fortune of the Ottoman Empire, who had not been victorious in the last two centuries, and won the Greek War. The war that ended at the front continues at the table now.

Parvus, the proclaimed vizier of the Global Monarchy, pretends to be an engineer and gets into the palace. The Sultan is preparing the state for a great war with his development moves and launches the oil move that starts wars for the new century after the railway move. While Parvus is struggling to end the Payitaht with agents spread all over Constantinople under the leadership of Marco, his right-hand man, Sultan Abdülhamid's extraordinary and successful nephew, Murad, fights with his team at the expense of their lives.

Sultan Abdülhamid is unaware of the storms in his harem while fighting to protect Payitaht. Entering to avenge her mother, who was fired from the palace, Firuze helps the enemies in their war against the Ottoman Dynasty. She gets Abdülkadir to fall in love with her, and causes all the balances to turn upside down between Bidar Sultan and Seniha Sultan. At the end of the season, Bidar Sultan, who left the palace, has an accident and her carriage falls down a cliff, severely injuring her. Parvus, although in a cage, makes a plan to kill the entire palace; using a man named Mr. Crowly, he gets poison gas into the palace by using a new invention, the radiator, and poisons everyone during a ceremony. But at the end, Fehim Pasha, risking his life, shot Mr. Crowly, dying in the process.

Season 3

In the palace, the wounds of the last serious incident are tried to be healed, and the death of Fehim Pasha is mourned. Sultan Abdülhamid ensured Parvus was thrown into the dungeon in Britain. The partner of this plan, Crowly, is found where he is hiding in Egypt and punished by Halil Halid. Fuad Efendi, the son of a former Khedive of Egypt, comes to the Payitaht. Bidar Sultan cannot forget what has happened to her. Moreover, she cannot make anyone believe what she remembers about her accident, which is that it was deliberate and that she was kidnapped and taken to someone's house; everyone just calls it nightmares. Meanwhile, Şivenaz, fiancé of Fuad Efendi and daughter of Edmond Rothschild, comes to the palace and makes problems in the harem.

The Young Turks become a true organization when Sabahattin goes to Paris and becomes a leader. Sultan Abdülhamid sends Zühtü Pasha, who everyone thinks is a traitor, to Paris as a spy. However, when he gets information that one of the Pashas actually is a spy, he calls the head of intelligence, to find the traitor. Around the end of the season, Fuad Efendi's betrayal is uncovered and he is shot by Ahmed Pasha, while at the end of the season his fiancée Şivenaz gets killed by Şehzade Abdülkadir and the Young Turks start a revolution, attacking the palace. Tahsin Pasha, Mahmud Pasha, and Ahmed Pasha all get shot and the Sultan and his family are stuck inside the burning palace.

Season 4

The revolution was suppressed and the fire in the palace was extinguished. However, its consequences and destruction continue. Sultan Abdülhamid makes Veladet-i-Humayun celebrations to show that the Ottoman Empire was not destroyed and cannot be destroyed easily. The news of victory from Payitaht brings together the adversaries of Abdül Hamid once again. During the celebration, Zuluflu Ismail Pasha is revealed to be the elder brother of Sultan Abdülhamid, surprising everyone including the enemies. Cemile Sultan, who came to Payitaht for Veladet-i-Humayun celebrations, manages to disturb everyone in the harem, causing Seniha Sultan to leave.

Meanwhile, Zalman David Levontin comes to Payitaht disguised as Mr. Gustav, making secret moves against Sultan Abdülhamid. Zalman is eventually exposed and punished, so the Brits send William Hechler as an ambassador. A second railway project in Baghdad was established in addition to the Hejaz railway, posing a threat to the British in terms of strategic location. Hechler openly becomes enemies with Sultan Abdülhamid, making many moves before being defeated and imprisoned. However, one of Hechler's men arranges an assassination for the Sultan and shoots at him with a sniper which injures Ahmed Pasha (not shown) and the season ends there.

Season 5

Season 5 begins with Ferid Pasha becoming the Grand Vizier. Sultan Abdülhamid's older brother Murad V passes away, leaving behind an heir that will take his place in the Freemasons, which he left in his will in the form of a composition. It is not long before the composition gets decoded by a man. Ahmed, İsmail and Selim Pasha were ordered to follow that man on a train to Thessaloniki, but he gets killed, raising suspicion on the three. Since a meeting for the Masons was held in Thessaloniki around that time, either one of them could have been the Mason Pasha. All three Pashas were questioned. İsmail and Ahmed Pasha called each other the traitor, and someone named Manyas confronts both of them with conflicting information about the other's supposed treachery. Manyas is also the one in contact with the real Mason Pasha and is associated with the Young Turks. After losing trust and being demoted from his rank, Ahmed Pasha secretly turns against Sultan Abdülhamid and sides with Manyas and an opposition leader, Ahmed Riza. Many people were suspected by the Sultan. A Grand Lodge of the Masons is established after the previous one at Thessaloniki, consisting of Karasu, Sabahattin, Fernandez, Selim Pasha and others. The Sultan's son Ahmed Nuri arrives to help defeat the Masons and the opposition. While Selim Pasha is seemingly discovered to be the Mason Pasha, he was instead being threatened by Mahmud Pasha to work on behalf of him.

After a series of events Mahmud Pasha is forced to flee from the palace and takes refuge with the British embassy and the Masons. Mahmud Pasha moved to Paris but before moving tells the Sultan that he was actually a spy inside the Masons. He reveals that he joined the Masons to destroy them internally. He also reveals he is very sick. In Paris, Mahmud Pasha obtains information from his opposition son Sabahattin and Karasu. He sends this information to then palace to help destroy Mason's and keep the Empire safe. Mahmud Pasha then dies due to sickness. After a violent turn of events Abdülhamid restores the constitutional monarchy and dismisses Tahsin Pasha from duty.

The series then skips many years into the future. It is revealed that Tahsin Pasha was dismissed and given a secret duty to document all the events that took place in the Reign of the Sultan Abdülhamid. Tahsin Pasha then tells a journalist the many events that took place during the Sultan's reign. It is revealed that Sogutlu Osman died in the line of duty for the State. A brief encounter also occurred between the dethroned Abdülhamid and Talaat Pasha, who was then a prominent figure of the government. It is told that they spoke about the reasons for Ottomans Joining WW1, and also about certain fortifications made by the Sultan to prevent European entry into the capital. It is mutually known to both that the Ottoman Empire was about to collapse. The funeral of Abdülhamid is also shown.

The season and series ends with Sultan Abdülhamid's dream of walking down a long hall seeing the great previous Ottoman rulers. The rulers shown were Suleiyman the Lawgiver, Selim the Stern, Mehmed the Conqueror, and finally, Osman Gazi. Each ruler gives a short message to Abdülhamid. The final scene shows Abdülhamid standing in front of a painting of himself in the hall.

Cast and characters

Season 1

Season 2

Season 3

Season 4

Season 5

Controversy

According to an opinion piece from staff members of the Foundation for Defense of Democracies published on The Washington Post, the series allegedly promotes an "antidemocratic", "antisemitic" and "conspiratorial" worldview, opining that the show depicts that "a free press, secularism and democracy are the work of foreign powers, religious minorities, and godless liberals, and ultimately serve to erode national identity, honor, and security. Of all the series’ villains, none are more sinister than the Jews."

Ritman and Galuppo stated that the television series portrays Abdülhamid "as a noble leader forced to do what he must to protect the Ottoman Empire", at odds with the negative reputation with historians outside of Turkey for allowing the Hamidian massacres.

Theodor Herzl, the liberal founder of modern Zionism, is one of the villains of the series who is portrayed as a man so perfidious as to hold his penniless father prisoner without his mother's knowledge because of alleged ideological differences. The show depicts him at the First Zionist Congress, portrayed in such a way as to evoke the Elders of Zion, planning to create a Jewish state spanning from the Nile to the Euphrates, which is a popular anti-Zionism conspiracy theory. Meanwhile, the coin-flipper for the Sultan is portrayed as a secret Vatican agent allegedly working on behalf of Herzl, even though the Vatican allegedly opposed the establishment of Israel. The Washington Post noted that this portrayal was "revisionist in the extreme".

The anti-Westernism present in the show's message has also been remarked upon, as the production portrays "Jewish conspiracies" as melding together with the nefarious plots of the Catholic Church, Freemasonry, Britain as well as other Western powers, and the Young Turks into "one overarching scheme". The Vatican emissary is named "Hiram", a name that is associated with Freemasonry.

Reception

Political endorsements in Turkey

The Washington Post's opinion piece noted that various actors in Turkey's political scene seemed to explicitly endorse the messages present in the show.

In Turkey, the show has met the approval of a descendant of Abdulhamid, who said "history repeats itself … these meddling foreigners now call our president a dictator, just as they used to call Abdulhamid the ‘Red Sultan’".

Turkish President Recep Tayyip Erdoğan praised the show's portrayals just two days before a referendum, saying "the same schemes are carried out today in the exact same manner... What the West does to us is the same; just the era and actors are different". Deputy Prime Minister Numan Kurtulmuş lauded the show for "shedding light" on Sultan Abdulhamid's life in "an objective manner", and gave a personal visit to the set. It is noted that Sultan Abdulhamid frequently used the same Quranic-inspired catchphrases as President Erdoğan, notably including "If they have a plan, God too has a plan!".

When discussing the series, Sultan Abdül Hamid's great-grandson and Head of the Osmanoğlu family Harun Osman said the following:
The popularity of television series about the Ottoman Empire has grown significantly in recent years in Turkey, and the Turkish government has encouraged a nostalgia for the greatness of the former empire which is sometimes referred to as 'Neo-Ottomanism'.

The Balkans

Although Turkish soap operas are wildly popular in the Balkans, Payitaht: Abdülhamid has caused some controversy in places such as Kosovo due to its message and alleged historical revisionism.

See also

 Other productions by :
 Filinta
 The Ottoman Lieutenant
 
 List of Islam-related films

References

External links
 Payitaht: Abdülhamid – 
 Payitaht Abdülhamid on IMDb
 Payitaht Abdülhamid by PTV Home

Television series about the Ottoman Empire
Turkish Radio and Television Corporation original programming
Turkish-language television shows
2017 Turkish television series debuts
Television series about Islam
Television series set in the 19th century
Historical television series
Current Turkish television series
Television shows set in Istanbul
Television series produced in Istanbul
Turkish historical television series